Carex azuayae is a species of flowering plant in the sedge family, Cyperaceae. It is endemic to Ecuador. Its natural habitat is subtropical or tropical high-altitude grassland.

References

Sources

azuayae
Flora of Ecuador
Endangered plants
Plants described in 1963
Taxonomy articles created by Polbot